Taste of Chocolate is the third album by American rapper Big Daddy Kane, released in October 1990 on Cold Chillin' Records. The album reached No. 10 on the Billboard Top Soul Albums chart and No. 37 on the Billboard 200 chart.

Overview
Artists such as Barbara Weathers, Gerald Albright and Barry White appeared on the album.

Singles
"Cause I Can Do It Right" reached No. 22 on the Billboard Hot R&B Singles chart and No. 4 on the Billboard Hot Rap Singles chart.  "It's Hard Being the Kane" reached No. 17 on the Billboard Hot Rap Singles chart and "All of Me" featuring Barry White got to No. 14 on the Billboard Hot R&B Singles chart.

Track listing

Samples
"Big Daddy vs. Dolemite"
"Whatcha See Is Whatcha Get" by The Dramatics
"Cause I Can Do It Right"
"Stubborn Kind of Fellow" by Marvin Gaye
"I Heard It Through the Grapevine" by Gladys Knight & the Pips
"Get Up and Dance" by Freedom
"Dance With the Devil"
"Different Strokes" by Syl Johnson
"Superpeople" by The Notations
"It's Hard Being the Kane"
"Loose Booty" by Sly & the Family Stone
"Roadblock (12" Version)" by Stock, Aitken Waterman
"Keep 'Em on the Floor"
"Talkin' Loud & Sayin' Nothing" by James Brown
"Mr. Pitiful"
"Person to Person" by Average White Band
"No Damn Good" 
"Sophisticated Sissy" by Rufus Thomas
"Put Your Weight on It"
"Impeach the President" by The Honey Drippers
"Rocket in the Pocket (Live)" by Cerrone
"The Big Beat" by Billy Squier
"Taste of Chocolate"
"I'll Take You There" by The Staple Singers
"Was It Something That I Said" by Sylvester
"Get Out of My Life, Woman" by Lee Dorsey 
"Poison" by Bell Biv DeVoe
"Who Am I"
"Ain't Nobody Home" by B.B. King

Charts

Weekly charts

Year-end charts

Singles

References

Big Daddy Kane albums
1990 albums
Albums produced by Prince Paul (producer)
Albums produced by Big Daddy Kane
Cold Chillin' Records albums